The second season of the American psychological thriller television series You was ordered by Lifetime on July 26, 2018. On December 3, 2018, it was announced that the network had passed on the second season and that the series would move to Netflix as a Netflix Original series. Penn Badgley and Ambyr Childers reprise their roles while new cast members include Victoria Pedretti, James Scully, Jenna Ortega, and Carmela Zumbado. The 10-episode second season is loosely based on the novel Hidden Bodies by Caroline Kepnes and was entirely released on Netflix on December 26, 2019.

Synopsis 
In the second season, Joe Goldberg moves from New York to Los Angeles to escape his past, and starts over with a new identity. He meets a series of people, including his neighbors Delilah and Ellie Alves, and Forty Quinn. When he meets avid chef Love Quinn, twin sister of Forty, Joe begins falling into his old patterns of obsession and violence. As Joe attempts to forge a new love, he strives to make his relationship with Love succeed at all costs, to avoid the fate of his past romantic endeavors.

Cast and characters

Main 
 Penn Badgley as Joe Goldberg, a serial killer and bookstore clerk at Anavrin, now using the pseudonym Will Bettelheim for a new identity
 Victoria Pedretti as Love Quinn, an aspiring chef and health guru in Los Angeles
 Jenna Ortega as Ellie Alves, Joe's savvy 15-year-old neighbor
 James Scully as Forty Quinn, Love's troubled twin brother
 Ambyr Childers as Candace Stone, Joe's ex-girlfriend and a fledgling musician posing as an indie film producer
  Carmela Zumbado as Delilah Alves, an investigative reporter and Ellie's older sister

Recurring 
 Adwin Brown as Calvin, a manager at Anavrin, a trendy high-end grocery store
 Robin Lord Taylor as Will Bettelheim, a hacker whose identity Joe briefly assumes
 Marielle Scott as Lucy Sprecher, an edgy-chic talent agent and Sunrise's partner
 Chris D'Elia as Joshua "Henderson" Bunter, a famous stand-up comedian in Los Angeles
 Charlie Barnett as Gabe Miranda, a successful acupuncturist and Love's oldest friend and closest confidant
 Melanie Field as Sunrise Darshan Cummings, Lucy's partner and a stay-at-home lifestyle blogger
 Aidan Wallace as Little Joe Goldberg
 Magda Apanowicz as Sandy Goldberg, Joe's mother
 Danny Vasquez as David Fincher, a LAPD officer
 Saffron Burrows as Dottie Quinn, Love and Forty's mother

Guest 
 Elizabeth Lail as Guinevere Beck, Joe's deceased ex-girlfriend and former obsessive interest
 Steven W. Bailey as Jasper Krenn, a criminal to whom Will owes money
 Kathy Griffin as Mary, comedienne friend of Henderson
 Michael Reilly Burke as Ray Quinn, Love and Forty's father
 John Stamos as Dr. Nicky, Joe's ex-therapist whom he framed for Beck's murder in the previous season
 David Paladino as Alec Grigoryan, a private investigator hired by Love to investigate Candace
 Haven Everly as Gigi, Will's fiancée
 Andrew Creer as Milo Warrington, James' best friend and Love's new boyfriend after her breakup with Joe
 Daniel Durant as James Kennedy, Love's deaf and deceased husband who died of cancer
 Madeline Zima as Rachel, Candace/Amy's roommate who knows Krav Maga
 Brooke Johnson as Sofia, Forty's au pair lover

Episodes

Production

Development 
You was renewed for a second season in July 2018, by Lifetime. In November 2018, Gamble confirmed that like Hidden Bodies, the sequel novel to You, the setting of the series would move to Los Angeles for the second season. On December 3, 2018, it was confirmed that Lifetime had passed on the series and that Netflix picked up the series ahead of the release of the second season.

Casting 
On January 30, 2019, it was announced that Victoria Pedretti had been cast in the main role of Love Quinn on the second season. On January 31, 2019, James Scully was cast in a main role as Forty Quinn, Love's brother and Jenna Ortega was also cast in a main role as Ellie Alves.

On February 1, 2019, Deadline Hollywood reported that Ambyr Childers had been promoted to a series regular role, ahead of the premiere of the second season. On February 6, 2019, Adwin Brown was cast in the recurring role of Calvin on the second season. On February 15, 2019, Robin Lord Taylor was cast in the recurring role of Will on the second season. On February 21, 2019, Carmela Zumbado was cast in the series regular role of Delilah Alves on the second season. On March 4, 2019, Marielle Scott had been cast in the recurring role of Lucy on the second season. On March 5, 2019, Chris D’Elia was cast in the recurring role of Henderson on the second season. On March 26, 2019, Charlie Barnett was cast in the recurring role of Gabe on the second season.  On April 4, 2019, Melanie Field and Magda Apanowicz were cast in recurring roles as Sunrise and Sandy, respectively. On June 4, 2019, Danny Vasquez had been cast in a recurring role. On June 24, 2019, it was confirmed that John Stamos would reprise his role as Dr. Nicky in the second season. On October 17, 2019, Elizabeth Lail confirmed in a BUILD Series interview that she would reprise  her role as Guinevere Beck in a guest appearance on the second season.

Filming 

Filming for the second season took place on location in Los Angeles, California from February 2019 to June 2019.

Reception 
The second season received positive reviews from critics. On the review aggregator website Rotten Tomatoes, the season holds a 87% approval rating with an average rating of 8.01/10 based on 45 reviews. The website's critical consensus reads, "Penn Badgley's perversely endearing serial stalker keeps looking for love in all the wrong places during a second season that maintains the subversive tension while adding some welcome variations on the series' formula." On Metacritic, the second season has a weighted average score of 74 out of 100, based on 17 critics, indicating "generally favorable reviews".

Alicia Lutes of IGN gave the second season, a 8.7/10, stating that "You goes the distance in its second season, giving us plenty of reasons to hang around Joe Goldberg’s toxic Nice Guy Serial Killer Shack a little longer" and adds that the "show's twists and turns take us places both expected and unexpected, putting a larger focus on the internal struggle of Joe's obsessive personality." Robyn Bahr from The Hollywood Reporter mentioned in a glowing review of the second season, that "You remains as captivating as ever. Any other show would beg you to love its protagonist while revealing their childhood trauma. This one reminds you to keep your empathy under lock and key." Sonia Saraiya from Vanity Fair recommended the second season in her review by highlighting that "You is committed to keeping the audience guessing, and as with the first season, much of the story is a chain of wild twists". Commending the show writers' approach in the second season, she adds that "You exhibits no sophomore slump".

Tilly Pearce from Metro praised the second season, stating that it is "You Season 2 is more than enough to quench your thirst for twisted-in-a-sexy-way killers and keep you hooked for a serious binge session. The show doesn’t exactly change the wheel when it comes to the format, but ultimately there’s enough changes that you can get over it quickly. Penn Badgley is perfect in this role, as is Victoria Pedretti, and we can’t wait to see what season three (assuming it happens) brings."

Joshua Rivera of The Verge gave the second season a positive recommendation, writing that "At first, it seems like You is simply repeating itself, playing the same beats with a different woman in Joe’s sights..." but adds that due to "a combination of Badgley’s performance and the incredible savvy of every member of the crew that points a camera or light at him, you frequently suffer whiplash for liking him, as he goes from charming book nerd to sardonic lead to super creep in the same shot." Clémence Michallon of The Independent gave the second season a very positive review, writing: "What follows is a dark psychological thriller that manages to be in every way as enthralling as its predecessor – a rare feat in a world where too many TV shows fail to quit while they’re ahead." He said further, "Rivetingly told and well acted, YOU manages to make a viscerally unlikable protagonist endlessly interesting. That is no small achievement."

In a positive review of the second season, Angelica Jade Bastién from Vulture wrote that, "You proves itself to be a momentous, darkly spun treat this season that doles out blissful fun while providing fascinating commentary about the nature of desire, and it continues to be a great showcase for Badgley’s wiry menace." Kimberly Ricci from Uproxx complimented the second season in her review, adding that it "begins as twisted comfort food for fans, but by midseason, it becomes clear that this is a whole new stalker ballgame." She concluded with a positive recommendation, noting that "the season finale dangles a promise of even more madness to come." LaToya Ferguson from IndieWire gave the series an A− grade, praising the second season for its "sly sense of humor" which she further adds "continues to make the series pretty funny". She ends her review in a recommendation, highlighting that the second season "proves Season 1 wasn’t lightning in a bottle".

Release

Marketing 
On December 5, 2019, a teaser trailer for the second season was released by Netflix. On December 16, 2019, the official trailer for the second season was released. The second season was released on December 26, 2019.

References

External links 
 
 

2019 American television seasons
Season 2